Coláiste Iognáid SJ, a bilingual secondary school, is located on Sea Road in Galway, Ireland. It was founded in 1645 and has had numerous locations over the years before its current home. The college is a co-educational, non-fee-paying secondary school and one of a number of Jesuit schools in Ireland. There are approximately 600 pupils in the school.

Organisation
Coláiste Iognáid is run by a board of management comprising parent, teacher, and Jesuit representatives. It is non-fee-paying, co-educational, and has no school uniforms. Students study there from ages thirteen to eighteen and sit the Junior and Leaving Certificate examinations. Each of the six-year groups is divided into four classes. The four groups are Gaeilge ("Irish Stream"), Xavier, Loyola, and Collins (G, X, L, C). Students are taught in similar ability classes throughout the school. The school is known locally as the 'Jes'.

In the fourth year ("Transition Year"), all students are reassigned into one of four classes, Brebeuf, Gonzaga, Ricci, or Claver (B, G, R, C). The classes return to the initial four groups in the fifth year for Irish classes only. The reorganisation of the groups for the fourth year is part of the school's "Transition Year" programme. While the Transition Year is optional in some Irish schools, it is compulsory in Coláiste Iognáid.

History

Since 1620, the Jesuits have, with some involuntary intermissions, been working with and for the people of Galway. In 1645 their first school was founded through the generosity of Edmund Kirwan. While the language of the classroom was Latin, only the Jesuits with a fluent command of Irish were sent on the "Irish Mission".

The school, which was incorporated into a Jesuit residence in the present Abbeygate Street, continued in Galway through a time of political upheaval and military activity.

In 1859, at the request of the Bishop of Galway, the Jesuits once more took up residence in the city, this time in Prospect Hill and served in the nearby St. Patrick's Church. Within a year they had opened a college near the site of the present Bank of Ireland at 19 Eyre Square. The college's present location on Sea Road dates from 1863, when it was built the same year as the Jesuit church next door, St Ignatius Church.

The modern phase of Coláiste Iognáid began in 1929. The local enthusiasm for the language revival efforts of the emerging Republic of Ireland was to be served by a re-invigorated Coláiste Iognáid, which became an Irish-medium School in 1931.

In 1967, in contrast with its foundation of 1620, Coláiste Iognáid became part of the "non-fee-paying" secondary school system. In 1969, with the co-operation of management and staff, coupled with the help of parents, past pupils, and friends of the Jesuits, the present main school building, the Griffin Building, was built.

In 1974, when the school population was increased to provide three-form entry, one co-educational form became the Irish-medium Scoil Gaeilge. Following consultation with staff and Jesuits, the school established the Board of Management in 1980 to take shared responsibility for all aspects of the school – the first agreed board of its kind in Ireland.

In 1982, the school underwent a buildings programme. This produced a new science block (O’Reilly Building), a refurbished classroom block (Andrews Building), a library, and art, computer, and co-educational facilities. The Colombian Hall was refurbished and an indoor sports area was added. Co-education was extended to the whole school in 1984, to become the first fully co-educational secondary school in the city.

The senator Pádraig Ó Céidigh taught at Coláiste Iognáid for a time.

Rectors
 Rev. MacArdle, S.J. 
 Rev. Henry Foley, S.J.
 Rev. William Dargan, S.J.
 Rev. John Hughes, S.J.
 Rev. Andrew O'Reilly, S.J.
 Rev. Fergal McGrath, S.J., B.A., D.Phil.

Education

Coláíste Íognáíd is a non-fee-paying, co-educational, secondary school, comprising Jesuit and lay staff and catering to a broad spectrum of social and academic intake. The school has a three-form entry. One form offers education through Irish up to Junior Certificate and all three forms offer mixed-ability teaching.

Curriculum
In the three-year junior cycle all pupils follow the Junior Certificate syllabus in the core subjects of Irish, English, maths, French, commerce, science, geography, history, S.P.H.E., and C.S.P.E., as well as religion and physical education.  There are also options to study home economics, technical graphics, art, music (each student studies one of these), and German, which can be chosen instead of French.  
 
Transition year follows the Junior Certificate and comprises a selection of courses designed within the school and taught as modules. The subjects taken are as follows: accounting, art - design & craft, career guidance, computers, English (in 4 modules - media studies, modern fiction, drama, creative writing), French, Gaeilge, geography, German, history, home economics, safety, home maintenance, mathematics, music, P.E., religious education, science, Spanish, and social studies.

In the two-year Senior cycle pupils prepare for the Leaving Certificate. In addition to religious education, pupils study Irish, English, maths, French, and a choice of three from chemistry, accountancy, German, art, physics, geography, economics, music, biology, history, business, home economics (social and scientific), and design and communication graphics.

Sport and extracurricular activities

Staff, parents, and former pupils undertake extracurricular activities voluntarily. It is expected that each pupil will participate in at least one of the activities provided. As circumstances allow, the school provides the following sports: rowing, Gaelic football, rugby, hockey, soccer, basketball, canoeing, athletics, swimming and mountaineering.

Gaelic football is now very popular in the school. And in 2017, both the Junior Gaelic Football team and the Juvenile team have qualified for their respective Connacht finals. The Junior team played Glenamaddy and the Juvenile team (U-15) played Garbally College.
 
Pupils also participate in various clubs and cultural activities such as debating (Irish and English), drama, social action, and orchestra. With many of the nearby schools, extra-curricular activities pupils enter city, provincial, and national competitions like Feile Scoil Dramaiochta, Feis Cheoil na hÉireann, Concern and Denny debates, the Young Scientist Competition, golf, and the various blitz, cup, and league fixtures and regattas.

The school also produces a public musical/drama each year which the fifth years perform.

Basketball

The Jes has teams participating in regional girls' competitions at the senior and under-16 level and in boys' competitions in the under-16, second, and first-year age groups.

Debating

The school had a long history of debating and competes both nationally and internationally. As of 2015, it has had the highest tabbing for eight consecutive years. The current society, founded in 2007 by students Leah Colclough and Ciaran Garrett (winner of 2012 ESU John Smith Memorial International Mace), convenes every week and is open to all students. It competes in every major national and many international competitions available to students.

From 2006 to 2016, the society won the Denny Schools' Debating Connacht Title (now known as the "West of Ireland Debating Championship") eleven times. The school won the "double" at this level in 2010, winning the individual championship and the team award. In 2012 the society took part in a record 17 separate competitions around Ireland. In 2014 and 2015, the school won the "double".

The school was represented in the National Junior Mace finals every year of its existence and also qualified for ICYD nine times (2010,2011, 2012, 2013, 2014, 2015, 2016, 2017).

In 2015 (Frank O'Neill and Eoghan Finn) and 2017 (Kate Duggan and Conor O'Sullivan), the school qualified for Cambridge Senior International.

From 2008 to 2009 and in 2014, 2015,2016, the society won both the NUIG Junior and Senior Maces as well as being runners up in the All-Ireland Denny Schools Debating Competition.   Students featured as representatives to the Irish National Session of the European Youth Parliament and were selected to the National Schools’ Debate Team.  Two other students won the UCD Law Society Mace. Andrew Forde, won the Galway Public Speaking award and he and Eoghan Finn represented Ireland at the European Youth Parliament. From 2011 to 2012, the pair won the West of Ireland Schools Senior Debate Final, the Belvedere Junior Mace, the St. Conleth's Junior Mace, the Coláiste na hInse Junior Mace, the Trinity Senior Pro-Am Final, and the NUIG "Alan Kerins" Mace. From 2012 to 2013, the society were champions at the West of Ireland Senior Final, the Coláiste na hInse Junior Mace, and the National Junior Mace 2013. In September 2015 the school won the 2015 Belvedere Junior Mace chaired by Joe Duffy. They won the same competition again in 2016 with Conor O'Sullivan and Harry Redfern.

Liam Carton, Fionn Ryan and Kate Duggan won the Galway Advertiser City Schools Competition in 2016.

The school won the West of Ireland Debating Competition in 2014. The following year, in 2015, the school won it again, meaning that since its first involvement in 2004 the school has won it most of any school.

Since 2013 the school has run its own Junior Mace as part of the National Junior Mace event. It won it in 2013, 2014, 2016, 2017. In 2016 the school mace qualified 2 teams for ICYD Cambridge 2017, these speakers were among the top 88 young speakers in the world.

Hockey
From 2001 to 2006 the Senior Girls Hockey Team won Senior A leagues and represented Connacht at the National Finals.

In the 2005-2006 year a Senior B team was submitted for the first time since 1989. The team submitted in 1989 was the school's first hockey team and they won the competition. The following year they moved down to the C Division. They went on to win the league, defeating Salerno B 2–1 in the final.

In 2008 and 2009 the Senior team won the Connacht Schools Senior Cup with victories over Taylor's Hill and Our Lady's Bower Secondary School, Athlone, respectively in the finals. They then participated in the 2008-2009 ESB Kate Russell All-Ireland Girls Schools Finals where they beat Foyle and Londonderry College 3–2 in the final.

In 2010, Coláiste Iognáid hosted the Kate Russell All-Ireland Championships at Dangan Sports Ground.

Rowing

Coláiste Iognáid Rowing Club (CIRC) has won various regional and national trophies as well as having members represent Ireland in international competitions.

In the 2005–2006 season, the women's junior crew won the women's junior eights and fours championships of Ireland and became the Connaught Tribune Team of the Year. Four oarswomen from the club represented Ireland at the Home Internationals. Later in the year, the school bought new boats and oars.

The school had students representing Ireland in the Home International and Coupe de la Jeunesse competitions in 2007 and 2008. The Jes also sent crews to Ghent, Belgium, for the annual KRSG international regatta. There the men's crew finished first in the junior-18 fours. At the 2008, Coup de la Jeunesse at the NRC, Cork, Eddie Mullarkey was in the two-bow seat of the men's coxed four that took silver.

In 2008 the women won the all-Ireland junior women's eights title. In the 2008 Olympics in Beijing, Cormac Folan, a former student, competed in the bowseat of the Heavyweight Four, finishing 10th overall. Another ex-Jes rower, Paul Murray, won gold at the Universiade in Lithuania. That year, Cormac Folan of Freeport in Bearna represented Ireland in Rowing at the 2008 Summer Olympics.

At the 2009 European Junior Rowing Championships at Vichy, France, Zoe Mannion and Aifric Keogh, representing Ireland, finished second to Britain to win a silver medal in the women's junior pairs. Three weeks previously, rowing as Coláiste Iognáid, the pair won the junior title at the Irish National Rowing Championships held in Cork.

In 2016, the women won the junior 15 and 16 8s at the Irish Championships.

At the 2020 Tokyo Olympic Games Aifric Keogh was part of the bronze medal-winning women's coxless four team.

Rugby

The Jes S (Senior XV) have been the most successful side in Connacht since the new millennium, having won the Connacht Schools Senior Cup a record Eight times (2002, 2005, 2006, 2008, 2009, 2011, 2016 and 2017). In all since the School's first Cup win 1924, the school has a record of having won the Senior Cup on 14 occasions (second in the all time winners list) from 1913 to 2017, with several further final appearances.

In the 2007–2008 season the school progressed to the Connacht Schools Senior Cup Final where they met Marist College, Athlone and won 10–7. In 2008–2009, the Jes beat Sligo Grammar School 10–3 to record their 11th victory in this competition and move up to third in the all-time-winners list. In 2011, the Jes beat Sligo Grammar again in the semi-finals 30–5. The Jes returned to the final for season 2015/16, resulting in the Cup returning to Sea Road after a 16–15 win over Garbally College. The Cup was retained in the 2016–17 season when Summerhill College, Sligo were beaten 13–7.

The Junior Rugby Team (Jes J) reached the final of the Connacht Schools Junior Cup in recent years in 2006 and lost to Garbally 12–20. In 2015 they lost to CBS Roscommon and most recently in 2017 the lost narrowly to Garbally College by 17–13. The junior side have been Connacht Champions on four occasions (1918, 1978, 1981,1987) and have been finalists in 1999 and 1989 though records are incomplete.

Soccer 

In 2008-09 there were squads from three different age groups representing the school – first year, under-14s, and under 16s.

The under-14 and under-16 teams qualified for the knockout round of the Connacht schools cup – both coming through their groups through disqualification.

The senior squad reached the semi-final of the Connacht schools competition in 2014, losing to Summerhill College of Sligo.

Ultimate frisbee

The Jes Ultimate Frisbee Society (JUFS) started in 2014. It is a student-organised club. JUFS was the first in NUI Galway's Schools Ultimate Frisbee Programme. Both JUFS and the NUIG ultimate frisbee teams train together on a weekly basis. Although the JUFS is a senior-student-only club, a junior team is in the planning.

Other sports 
Unlike other schools in Galway, the Jes had no adjacent playing fields in the early 2000s yet both the under-19 boys and the under 16-girls made it to the All Ireland finals in 2008. In 2009, the under-16 basketball team again made it to the All Irelands. Since the launch of the new building, the school now has playing fields and several other sporting facilities including a basketball court and a gym.

The school also has a mountaineering club.

Other activities 

Coláiste Iognáid has a music department and stages a musical each year. The 2008 musical was Grecian Nights, an adaptation of "Mamma Mia!", in 2009, it was "Back to the '80s", 2010 was "Guys and Dolls", 2015 "Grease" and in 2016 it was "Happy Days", in 2017 it was Carl Hession's original musical "Hot House", in 2018 it was "Guys and Dolls, and in 2019 it was "Little Shop of Horrors" which came runner up in the GUM awards for Best Show.

Notable former students

Rugby union internationals 
 Eric Elwood
 Eoin Griffin 
 Eoin McKeon
 Claire Molloy
 Daniel Riordan
Miscellaneous
 Micheál Breathnach, writer
 William Joyce, Nazi propaganda broadcaster
 Proinsias Mac Aonghusa, journalist
 Frank Hugh O'Donnell
 Sean O'Rourke, RTÉ radio presenter
 Harry McGee, political correspondent with The Irish Times
 Seán Duignan, journalist, newsreader, political aide and writer
 Bobby Molloy, government minister
 Paul O'Higgins, legal scholar
 Fr.Peter Yorke - Irish American Priest, pastor of St. Peter's Church in Archdiocese of San Francisco and Labor activist
Aifric Keogh, rower and Olympic Medallist

Notable staff
 Johnny Geraghty, former Galway footballer

Scoil Iognáid

Associated with Coláiste Iognáid is Scoil Iognáid (English: St Ignatius School). It is a national school and is the main primary school of the college, located on Bothar Na Sliogan, 200m from the college.

It was founded by the Jesuits in 1971 and, like the college, was administered by them. It is also bi-lingual and coeducational. As of 2012 it had 550 pupils.

See also
 List of Jesuit sites in Ireland
 List of Jesuit schools

References

External links
  Coláiste Iognáid site
 Pierre Favre Archive at Coláiste Iognaid site
 Colaiste Iognaid Rowing Club site

1645 establishments in the British Empire
Boys' schools in the Republic of Ireland
Buildings and structures in Galway (city)
Educational institutions established in the 1640s
Education in Galway (city)
Jesuit secondary schools in Ireland
Secondary schools in County Galway